"King of the Whole Wide World" is a song written by Bob Roberts and Ruth Batchelor and originally recorded by Elvis Presley for the 1962 United Artists motion picture Kid Galahad. The track opened the 6-track soundtrack EP released in August 1962 to coincide with the film's premiere.

The song reached number 30 on the Billboard Hot 100. According to the Elvis Presley official website, "'King of the Whole Wide World' might have gotten more chart activity, but it was competing with 'She's Not You,' which had just broken into the Top 100 when the [soundtrack] EP was shipped."

Composition 
The song was written by Bob Roberts and Ruth Batchelor.

Recording 
Presley recorded the song for the film Kid Galahad on October 27, 1961, at Radio Recorders in Hollywood. The recording sessions featured Scotty Moore, Tiny Timbrell and Neal Matthews on guitar, Bob Moore on bass, D.J. Fontana and Buddy Harman on drums, Dudley Brooks on piano, Boots Randolph on saxophone. Additional vocals were provided by The Jordanaires.

Track listing

Charts

References

External links 
 
 One Broken Heart for Sale / They Remind Me Too Much of You on the official Elvis Presley website

1962 songs
1962 singles
Elvis Presley songs